The following is a list of AM radio stations transmitting in C-QUAM stereo throughout the world, which can be sorted by their call signs, frequencies, cities of license, country of origin, licensees, and programming formats.

Australian callsigns omit the ITU prefix VL when said on-air, leaving just the district number and suffix. The VL prefix is listed here to keep the stations in their correct order from a worldwide callsign standpoint. Similarly, Japanese stations sometimes omit the JO prefix in favor of just the last two letters of their callsigns.

Station names in quotes are from countries that do not issue ITU callsigns, and are listed after stations from countries that do issue callsigns.

References

List of A.M. stereo radio stations on meduci.com; retrieved August 12, 2020.
Asiawaves.net

AM